Hans Lipps (22 November 1889 – 10 September 1941) was a German phenomenological and existentialist philosopher.

Biographical sketch

Following his highschool graduation in Dresden in 1909, Lipps began studying art history, architecture, aesthetics and philosophy at the Ludwig Maximilian University of Munich. In 1910–1911 while doing his military service in Dresden he continued his philosophical studies at Dresden's University of Technology. In the spring of 1911 he moved to Göttingen to study with Edmund Husserl. Together with Theodor Conrad and his wife, Hedwig Conrad-Martius, as well as Roman Ingarden and Fritz Kaufmann, Lipps belonged to the famous "Philosophical Society of Göttingen" that gathered around Husserl and Adolf Reinach. This society also included Edith Stein, who described the young Lipps as follows: "He was very tall, slender but strong; his handsome, expressive face was fresh like a child's and his big round eyes were earnest – questioning like a child's eyes. He usually uttered his opinion in a short but definitive statement."

Lipps also studied biology. In the winter of 1912 he completed a doctorate with a dissertation entitled "About structural changes of plants in a modified medium", after which he began to study medicine. Between 1914 and 1918 he served in World War I as an assistant army physician. After the war he continued his interrupted studies in Göttingen and Freiburg i. Br. and completed his formal medical degree. In 1919 he received his license to practice medicine, and in 1920 he published a Ph.D. dissertation in medicine addressing "... the effect of certain colchicine derivatives".

In 1921 he completed his habilitation (qualification for professorship) under the mathematician Richard Courant, whom he had met through Edith Stein, with a dissertation entitled "Investigations into the philosophy of mathematics". Lipps had close personal links with the philosophers Josef König, Helmuth Plessner, and Georg Misch. During the academic year 1923/24 he and Misch conducted a seminar on the theory of signification (hermeneutics). In 1928 Lipps substituted for the professor of philosophy at the University of Marburg. Having declined a professorship at the University of Santiago de Chile, he accepted in 1936 the position of Ordinarius (chair professor) of philosophy at the University of Frankfurt am Main.

Throughout his academic career, Lipps continued occasionally to practice medicine, substituting alternatively for army physicians and country doctors. During the term breaks 1921/1922 and again 1930/1931, when he was already teaching as a professor, he served for extensive periods as a doctor in the navy, traveling to all continents except for Australia. In 1934 Hans Lipps joined the SS. According to Otto Friedrich Bollnow, Lipps did so to put a distance between himself and the NSDAP, submitting that SS was a purely military organisation.

At the beginning of World War II in September 1939 he was drafted to the military and served as an army doctor in France and Russia. He lost his life in a battle at Shabero/Ochwat on 10 September 1941 and was buried in the nearby cemetery of Dudino.

Philosophy as responsible self-acceptance

According to Lipps, human existence is grounded in the interpretation of reality. Asking about what something is refers to and fundamentally involves the human being, in relation to whom everything primarily is.

Husserl, too, demands a reversion. Yet his return is not directed towards the concrete human being but instead to a "transcendental ego" through which the concrete human being is to be constituted in the first place. Martin Heidegger substituted Husserl's intentional analysis of "transcendental consciousness" with the existential analytic of Dasein, as it has been expounded in Sein und Zeit in terms of a fundamental ontology.

Like Heidegger, Lipps inquires about the Sein of the concrete human being. While Heidegger interprets this Sein as a phenomenon in the sense of something "which-shows-itself," Lipps begins from the question: "Inwiefern wird in der mannigfachen Bedeutung des Seienden gerade die Verfassung meiner Existenz Erfahrung?" (To what extent does the manifold signification of Seiendes lead to the experience of the constitution of my existence?) With this question, Lipps moves closer to Husserl's method of transcendental inquiry ("transzendentale Leitfäden"). Unlike Husserl, however, Lipps is neither concerned with the constitution of Seiendes, nor – as Heidegger is – with the question about the "Sein des Seienden". From Lipps's point of view, Sein cannot be disentangled from the concretization of its essence ("was"). His focus is on the manifold meanings of being ("sein"): the "is" in statements such as "is blue", "is a lion", "is iron", "is rain", "is a speech", "is greed", etc. denotes different things and differs in its respective meaning. From this Lipps concludes: "Es gibt keine universelle Ontologie." (There is no universal ontology.)

So what exactly is the subject matter of Hans Lipps's philosophy? Does his thought move on a trajectory from the essence of things ("das Was der Dinge") via "language" ("Sprache") to the "human being" ("Mensch"), as his three major treatises might suggest? Lipps states: "Die Weise, in der der Philosophierende existiert, sich vor sich selbst bringt in der Bewegtheit seiner Einstellung - aber kein Gegenstand - bestimmt die Philosophie." (Philosophy is determined not by the object but by the mode in which the philosophizing subject exists and how it relates to itself in the movement of its perception) Philosophy is neither defined by a specific subject matter, nor a clearly delineated field of investigation; it cannot be compartmentalized into disciplines or taken into possession. "Philosophy" describes a direction and a point of view one cannot assume deliberately as it consists in an attitude that develops in direct opposition to my natural inclination. Philosophy does not intend to lay new grounds; rather it occurs "als verantwortliche Übernahme schon geschehener Grundlegung" (as a responsible adoption of an already existing groundwork). In philosophy I become conscious of myself.

Philosophy traces back to, and brings to awareness, what has been present before without being conscious of itself ("an ihm selber in seiner Vorgängigkeit unbewußt"). Thus I seek to become aware of myself in my origins, and consequently attain an original relationship to reality, not by disposing of prior decisions - which would be impossible - but by accepting myself in these prior decisions. Such a philosophy is not geared toward enlightenment but toward a responsible appropriation of myself in my origins, toward a responsible performance of my existence, toward existing properly. In this regard philosophy specifically is existential philosophy.

The term of reference of philosophy is reality ("Wirklichkeit"), to which I have always already reached out and within which I have gained pre-predicative understanding of myself as well as of reality. It is in this relationship that reality becomes real and that the human being realizes itself. The reality of myself as well as of other people is directed toward the reality of things, which refers back to the former. It is only in such proportionality that anything exists at all. It is ultimately for this reason that everything that is real and to the extent that it is real refers back to my own and other people's (practical and theoretical) ability by which human existence is realized. Such relationship is therefore an "indicator of existential possibilities": a piece of iron, the color blue, vision, cognition, embarrassment, etc.

Philosophy unveils human existence as the center of reality - in analogy to the interpretation of a text. For Lipps, philosophy is therefore a hermeneutics of reality directed at human existence for the purpose of enabling the latter to its own realization. As Lipps understands it, "hermeneutics" necessarily implies a fundamentally retroactive dimension.

Philosophy qua hermeneutics of reality is tied up with language, through which alone reality – both in terms of objects or things as well as of human beings - is being revealed. It is therefore the foremost task of philosophical inquiry to take up and follow the hints toward meaning and signification embodied in word and speech. And it must clarify those hints and explicate the pre-predicative mode of understanding they represent as grounded in the logos. This leads to the problem of the openness of the meaning of words.In open contrast to Husserl's theory of the "Ideal unities of significance" Lipps emphasized the "open indifference" of many utterances whose meaning changes according to the change of speech situation. This resembles Wittgenstein's conception of "language games" (a similarity seen for the first time by Gottfried Bräuer). A further similarity exists between Wittgenstein's "concepts with blurred edges" (Philosophical Investigations  § 71) and the "envisageing conceptions " which in both cases are illustrated by the word "Spiel". There is, however, no trace of any influence on either side.

Works
Hans Lipps: Werke in five volumes. Frankfurt a. Main: Vittorio Klostermann Verlag, 1976-1977.
 Volume I: Untersuchungen zur Phänomenologie der Erkenntnis. Part 1: "Das Ding und seine Eigenschaften " (1927); Part 2: "Aussage und Urteil " (1928). 
 Volume II: Untersuchungen zu einer hermeneutischen Logik (1938). 
 Volume III: Die menschliche Natur (1941). 
 Volume IV: Die Verbindlichkeit der Sprache. "Aufsätze und Vorträge" (1929 bis 1941), "Frühe Schriften" (1921 bis 1927), "Bemerkungen." 
 Volume V: Die Wirklichkeit des Menschen. "Aufsätze und Vorträge" (1932 bis 1939), "Frühe Schriften" (1921 und 1924), "Fragmentarisches." 

Hans Georg Gadamer writes in the preface to the edition of Lipps's works:
"In our days, Lipps's work should once again find its time. Mining in the quarry of language undertaken in England in the wake of Wittgenstein, Austin, and Searle has not only a predecessor, but an excellent counterpart in Hans Lipps. In questioning language, Lipps gains almost inexhaustible answers. Among phenomenologists, Lipps's standing in unrivaled in his aural sensitivity for language and this perception of gesture."

References

Sources and further reading
 Otto Friedrich Bollnow, Studien zur Hermeneutik. Volume II: "Zur hermeneutischen Logik von Georg Misch und Hans Lipps." Freiburg / München: Alber, 1983. 
 Otto Friedrich Bollnow, Hans Lipps: "Ein Beitrag zur philosophischen Lage der Gegenwart," in Blätter für Deutsche Philosophie.16 (1941/3), p. 293-323 [1]
 Gottfried Bräuer: Wege in die Sprache. Ludwig Wittgenstein und Hans Lipps,  in: Bildung und Erziehung 1963, pp. 131–140.
 Alfred W. E. Hübner, Existenz und Sprache. Überlegungen zur hermeneutischen Sprachauffassung von Martin Heidegger und Hans Lipps. Berlin: Duncker und Humblot, 2001. 
 Frithjof Rodi "Beiträge zum 100. Geburtstag von Hans Lipps am 22. November 1989: 4 Beiträge zur Biographie, 4 Beiträge zur Philosophie von Hans Lipps, Texte und Dokumente," in Dilthey-Jahrbuch für Philosophie und Geschichte der Geisteswissenschaften 6 (1989), ed. together with O. F. Bollnow, U. Dierse, K. Gründer, R. Makkreel, O. Pöggeler and H.-M- Sass. Göttingen: Vandenhoek & Ruprecht, 1989.
 Guy van Kerckhoven / Hans Lipps: Fragilität der Existenz. Phänomenologische Studien zur Natur des Menschen. Verlag Karl Alber, Freiburg / München 2011.  
 Gerhard Rogler, Die hermeneutische Logik von Hans Lipps und die Begründbarkeit wissenschaftlicher Erkenntnis. Würzburg: Ergon, 1998. 
 Wolfgang von der Weppen, Die existentielle Situation und die Rede. Untersuchungen zu Logik und Sprache in der existentiellen Hermeneutik von Hans Lipps. Würzburg: Königshausen und Neumann, 1984. 
 Meinolf Wewel, Die Konstitution des transzendenten Etwas im Vollzug des Sehens. Eine Untersuchung im Anschluß an die Philosophie von Hans Lipps und in Auseinandersetzung mit Edmund Husserls Lehre vom "intentionalen Bewußtseinskorrelat." Düsseldorf 1968.  - Google

1889 births
1941 deaths
Phenomenologists
SS personnel
German philosophers
German military doctors
German Army personnel of World War I
German Army personnel killed in World War II
German male writers
German Army officers of World War II
Military personnel from Dresden